Moira Rachelle Bustamante Dela Torre (born November 4, 1993) is a Filipino singer-songwriter. Born in Olongapo, Philippines, she began as a voice artist for corporate jingles and theme songs. In 2013, she competed in The Voice of The Philippines, releasing her debut EP Moira following her stint in the show. She rose to fame after interpreting Libertine Amistoso's "Titibo-Tibo" in the Himig Handog music video competition, in which it won.

Career

2013–2014: Career beginnings 
Dela Torre's career started as a voice artist working on corporate jingles and theme songs, including McDonald's "Hooray for Today", Surf's "Pinalaki", and Johnson & Johnson's "Signature of Love".

In 2013, Dela Torre auditioned in the first season of The Voice of the Philippines, singing "Hallelujah" by Bamboo Mañalac. She turned only one chair, that of apl.de.ap, and thus becoming a member of his team and advancing to the "battle round" of the show. She was eliminated in the battles, having been defeated by Penelope Matanguihan. Following her appearance in the show, she released her first single titled "Love Me Instead" through her debut EP album titled Moira, which was released under Ivory Music.

2016–2017: Breakthrough
Dela Torre performed singles for the official soundtracks of the romantic films Camp Sawi and Love You to the Stars and Back, namely "Malaya", and a cover of Moonstar88's "Torete".

In October 2017, she performed in the finals of the songwriting and music video competition Himig Handog. She served as the interpreter for Libertine Amistoso's song, "Titibo-Tibo". The song would become the grand winner of the competition; the performance for the competition became the most viewed performance for that year's edition. In late October, she became a member of the acoustic group ASAP Jambayan.

2018–2021: Idol Philippines 
In February 2018, her first concert "Tagpuan" sold out in four days on its first night; it was directed by John Prats. Due to public demand, the concert had a second night. Her 2018 debut album, Malaya, featured her hit singles "Malaya" and "Tagpuan". In December 2018, she became Spotify's No. 1 most streamed artist in the Philippines. Malaya album was certified 8× Platinum in the Philippines with more than 120,000 copies sold, making it the best-selling album in 2018.

Also, she became one of the judges in Idol Philippines, and on September of the said year, staged her second major concert at the Araneta Coliseum titled Braver.

2021–present: Patawad 
In March 2021 her second studio album "Patawad" was released, the album spawned the hit singles "Mabagal" featuring Daniel Padilla, "Patawad, Paalam" and "Paalam" featuring Ben&Ben. Patawad album was certified Platinum in the Philippines with more than 15,000 copies sold.

In 2022, Dela Torre officially signed with UMG Philippines thru label Republic Records Philippines. On January 20, 2023, she released "Ikaw at Sila", the first song in her upcoming album. The song modified the lyrics of previous works written with Jason Hernandez, to reflect their separation in the previous year.

Personal life
Dela Torre is a devout Christian, but has said "I don't like imposing my convictions on other people." She considers writing and performing worship songs her passion. Jason Hernandez announced his separation with Dela Torre on May 31, 2022, admitting his unfaithfulness to her during their marriage.

Of her "ritual" before performing, Dela Torre told the Philippine magazine Yes!: "Before performing, I just go to the banyo [restroom] and poop. Otherwise, I'll just fart [while performing], which I've done a number of times." She also revealed that two months after her marriage, she underwent a botched nose job, from which she recovered three months later while confined at home. According to Dela Torre, the non-invasive procedure had resulted in necrosis that put her "at high risk of being blind, of aneurysm, of heart attack, and stroke". Despite this, she said she had forgiven the surgeon who carried out the procedure and did not file a complaint.

Filmography

Film

Television

Discography

 Malaya (2018)
 Patawad (2020)
 Halfway Point (Reimagined) (2021)

Awards and nominations

References

External links

1993 births
Living people
21st-century Christians
21st-century Filipino women singers
Filipino Christians
People from Olongapo
Star Music artists
The Voice of the Philippines contestants